Akhrasan was a Nubian queen, so far only known from her burial in the royal cemetery of Nuri (Nu. 32). She was perhaps the wife of king Malewiebamani, althouɥgh this is not securely confirmed. Her only known title is king's wife. Her burial consisted of a pyramid and the underground burial rooms. There was a staircase going underground and leading to the two burial chambers. The burial was found robbed, but fragments of at least 45 shabtis were found. They bear the name and the title of the queen. Several pottery vessels and smaller objects were found too./

References 

5th-century BC women
Queens of Kush